The least chipmunk (Neotamias minimus) is the smallest species of chipmunk and the most widespread in North America.

Description
The body is gray to reddish-brown on the sides, and grayish white on the underparts. The back is marked with five dark brown to black stripes separated by four white or cream-colored stripes, all of which run from the nape of the neck to the base of the tail. Two light and two dark stripes mark the face, running from the tip of the nose to the ears. In some areas, where range overlap with the yellow-pine chipmunk occurs, it may be difficult or impossible to distinguish the two species in the field; laboratory examination of skeletal structures may be required.

As in other chipmunks, there are four toes on each of the forefeet and five on the hindfeet. Females have eight teats. The brain to body mass ratio for least chipmunks is lower than that for other species of chipmunk living in the same area, suggesting that they prefer less complex environments.

Distribution and habitat
Least chipmunks are found through most of the western United States from northern New Mexico and western North and South Dakota to eastern California, Oregon and Washington, and throughout much of southern and western Canada from Yukon and southeastern British Columbia to central Ontario, and into the Upper Peninsula of Michigan and neighboring parts of Wisconsin and Minnesota. Throughout this range, as many as 21 subspecies have been identified. Less arboreal than other chipmunks, least chipmunks are commonly found in sagebrush habitats and coniferous woodland, and along rivers, but they also occur in alpine meadows, and on the edges of the northern tundra.

Behavior
Least chipmunks are diurnal and eat seeds, berries, nuts, fruits and insects. They mark areas depleted of suitable food with urine, and do not return to such patches afterwards. Because of their small size, least chipmunks are generally subordinate to yellow-pine chipmunks, which are able to drive them away from food resources where food is plentiful. However, because they need to eat less food in order to survive, least chipmunks are more numerous where resources are scarce.

Predators include hawks, owls, and mustelids.

Least chipmunks spend the winter in burrows and also scatter-hoard food in numerous concealed pits beneath logs and similar cover. During the summer they may construct temporary nests in trees from leaves and grass, or appropriate hollows made by woodpeckers.

Least chipmunks do not hibernate, or put on excess fat in the fall. Instead, they survive the winter by entering torpor for long stretches of time, waking to eat food cached in the burrow. How much of each winter they spend below ground in this manner depends on the latitude, varying from late November to mid March in Michigan to mid October to late April in northern Manitoba.

Reproduction
Females enter estrus within a week of emerging from their burrow in the spring, and mating typically takes place between March and May. Gestation lasts 28 to 30 days, with a single litter of three to seven young being born each year; females who lose their first litter soon after birth may, however, sometimes be able to breed again in the same year. They are able to stand and open their eyes at 27 days, and are weaned at 36 days. They are sexually mature at one year, but do not always breed until their second year. They can live for up to six years in captivity.

Gallery

References

Neotamias
Fauna of the Great Lakes region (North America)
Mammals of Canada
Mammals of the United States
Least concern biota of North America
Least concern biota of the United States
Mammals described in 1839
Taxa named by John Bachman